"In the City of Slaughter" is a Hebrew poem written in 1904 by Hayim Nahman Bialik about the 1903 Kishinev pogrom.

Max Dimont wrote that "Bialik's poem caused thousands of Jewish youths to cast off their pacifism and join the Russian underground to fight Czar and tyranny." Steven Zipperstein wrote that the poem is considered "the most influential" if not "the finest" "Jewish poem written since medieval times."

References

1904 poems
Gender and Judaism
Hebrew-language literature
Jewish poetry
Kishinev pogrom
Masculinity
Poems about rape
Zionism